Francisco Javier "Patxi" Vila Errandonea (born 11 October 1975 in Hondarribia, Basque Country) is a Spanish Basque former professional road bicycle racer who rides for the UCI Professional Continental team . He was formerly with UCI ProTeam , before being banned for 18 months after testing positive for the use of testosterone.

Vila's most notable victory came in stage 3 of the 2006 Paris–Nice where he snatched onto the wheel of Floyd Landis as he escaped on the Col de Croix de Chaubouret. The duo amassed a lead of over a minute on their nearest contenders and Vila swept past Landis to take the stage. This performance catapulted him to second overall on the general classification, 9 seconds behind Floyd Landis. He finished the race in Nice still 9 seconds behind winner Floyd Landis and 56 seconds ahead of Antonio Colom.

He finished the 2006 UCI ProTour in 38th place with 69 points, the third highest ranked Lampre–Fondital rider behind Alessandro Ballan and Damiano Cunego.

After retiring from competition Vila worked for Specialized Bicycle Components as a performance specialist before joining  in 2015 as a directeur sportif.

Major results

 2006 Paris–Nice – 1 stage

See also
 List of doping cases in cycling

References

External links 

Profile at Lampre-Fondital official website

 VeloNews biography

Cyclists from the Basque Country (autonomous community)
Spanish male cyclists
1975 births
Living people
Doping cases in cycling
Spanish sportspeople in doping cases
People from Hondarribia
Sportspeople from Gipuzkoa